The SN76489 Digital Complex Sound Generator (DCSG) is a TTL-compatible programmable sound generator chip from Texas Instruments. Its main application was the generation of music and sound effects in game consoles, arcade games and home computers (such as the TI-99/4A, BBC Micro, ColecoVision, IBM PCjr, Tomy Tutor, and Tandy 1000), competing with the similar General Instrument AY-3-8910.

It contains:
 3 square wave tone generators.
 A wide range of frequencies.
 16 different volume levels.
 1 noise generator.
 2 types (white noise and periodic).
 3 different frequencies.
 16 different volume levels.

Overview
The SN76489 was originally designed to be used in the TI-99/4 computer, where it was first called the TMS9919 and later SN94624, and had a 500 kHz max clock input rate. A version of the chip without the divide-by-8 input was also sold outside of TI as the SN76494, which has a  max clock input rate.

Tone Generators
The frequency of the square waves produced by the tone generators on each channel is derived from two factors:

 The speed of the external clock
 A 10-bit value provided in a control register for that channel (called N)

Each channel's frequency is arrived at by dividing the external clock by 4 (or 32 depending on the chip variant), and then dividing the result by N. Thus the overall divider range is from 4 to 4096 (or 32 to 32768). At maximum clock input rate, this gives a frequency range of 122 Hz to 125 kHz. Or typically 108 Hz to 111.6 kHz, with an NTSC colorburst (~3.58 MHz) clock input – a range from roughly A2 (two octaves below middle A) to 5–6 times the generally accepted limits of human audio perception.

Noise Generator
The pseudorandom noise feedback is generated from an XNOR of bits 12 and 13 for feedback, with bit 13 being the noise output. The pseudorandom generator is cleared to 0s (with the feedback bit set to 1) on writes to chip register 6, the noise mode register.

Product Family

There are two versions of the SN76489: the SN76489 (Narrow DIP version labeled SN76489N) and the SN76489A (Narrow DIP version labeled SN76489AN). The former was made around 1980–1982 and the latter from 1983 onward. They differ in that the output of the SN76489 is the inverse of the expected waveform (the waveform "grows" towards 0 V from 2.5 V), while the SN76489A the waveform is not inverted.

The SN76496 seems to be totally identical to the SN76489A in terms of the outputs produced, but features an "AUDIO IN" pin (on pin 9) for integrated audio mixing.

Clones and successors

Sega used real SN76489AN chips in their SG-1000 game console and SC-3000 computer, but used SN76489A clones in their Master System, Game Gear, and Sega Genesis game consoles. These modified sound chips were incorporated into the systems' video display processor (VDP). Although basic functionality is almost identical to that of the original SN76489A, a few small differences exist:
 The randomness for the noise channel is generated differently.
 The Game Gear's version includes an additional flag register that designates which speaker(s) each audio channel are output (left, right, or both).
 The periodic noise is 16 stages long rather than 15; this makes a significant difference for music/programs which use periodic noise, as sounds will play at 6.25% lower pitch than on the TI-made chips.

Another clone is the NCR 8496, used in some models of the Tandy 1000 computer. Later Tandy 1000 machines (notably the SL, TL and RL series) integrated the SN76496's functionality into the PSSJ ASIC.

Usage

Arcade video games
 These games shared a common board design by Tehkan that used three of the functionally identical SN76496:
 Baluba-Louk No Densetsu
 Senjyo
 Star Force
 These games shared a common board design by Universal Entertainment Corporation:
 Lady Bug (used 2)
 Mr. Do! (used 2 of a functionally-identical part labeled U8106)
 Mr. Do's Castle (used 4)
 Mr. Do's Wild Ride (used 4)
 Do! Run Run (used 4)
 From Konami:
Mikie
Road Fighter
Rush'n Attack
 Time Pilot '84 (used a functionally-identical part labeled Y2404)
 From Sega:
 Bank Panic
 Super Locomotive
 Sega Mega-Tech
 Sega System 1
 Sega System 2
 Sega System E (based on the Master System and used the clone chip in its VDP)
 Sega Zaxxon

Home hardware
 ALF's Music Card MC1 – Apple II add-on card, used three chips for a total of nine voices plus noise
 Bandai RX-78
 BBC Master
 BBC Micro
 Coleco Adam
 ColecoVision – used the SN76489AN
 Geneve 9640
 IBM PCjr – used the SN76489AN
 Memotech MTX
 Neo Geo Pocket
 Neo Geo Pocket Color - used a T6W28 SN76489-like clone
 Sega Game Gear – used a clone integrated into its VDP that has an additional speaker-output register for simple stereo support
 Sega Genesis – used a clone, SEGA PSG, integrated into its VDP as a secondary sound chip
 Sega Master System – used a clone, SEGA PSG, integrated into its VDP
 Sega Pico
 Sega SG-1000 – used the SN76489AN
 Sharp MZ-800 – used the SN76489AN
 Sord M5
 Tandy 1000 – early systems used SN76496 or NCR 8496, later systems integrated into PSSJ ASIC
 SN76489 ISA Soundboard – Hobbyist Soundcard for IBM XT/PC
 Lo-Tech Tandy Soundboard – Prototype Soundcard for IBM XT/PC
 TI-99/4A – used the original TMS9919
 Tomy Tutor
 Toshiba Pasopia 7
 VTech CreatiVision

References

External links

SN76489 Sound Chip Details
SN76489 on the Video Game Music Preservation Foundation wiki
SN76489 on SMSPower.org

Sound chips
SN76489